Kris Koenig is an American film producer, screenwriter, director and cinematographer known for his roles in the documentaries; 400 Years of the Telescope and Astronomy: Observations and Theories.

Early life and education
Kris Koenig was born in 1962 to Ramon Lee and Inez Koenig.  The Father was an Air Force fighter pilot and the family moved around a lot until Kris was in Middle School. Kris graduated from Gilroy High School in 1980. He attended Gavilan College.

Career
Kris Koenig joined the US Coast Guard where he was trained in navigation and visual signaling to serve as a Quartermaster.  He attended  the US Navy Dive school in Pearl Harbor and earned the rating of SCUBA diver. He later left the US Coast Guard 1985.

Koenig was licensed as a Master of Near Coastal Water (100 ton limit) and PADI Master SCUBA Instructor.  He worked as a dive instructor and boat captain at Peter Hughes Dive Bonaire from 1987 -1989. He also worked for  Skin Diver Magazine, Petersen Publishing, from 1989 – 1994.

In 2003, Koenig was hired by his future partner Anita Ingrao to work as a consultant on the PBS telecourse Astronomy: Observations and Theories (20 x :30). His role grew to become one of the project producers and writer.

Kris currently produces films under his company Koenig Films, Inc.

Awards and honors
Kris Koenig was awarded two Los Angeles Area Emmys in 2006, one for "Non-news Writing" and one for "Instructional Programming".

In 2017, Kris was awarded a Doctorate of Humane Letters from the New England College of Optometry and was the keynote speaker for the 2017 Commencement.

Kris has received numerous Telly Awards for his works.

Filmography
Kris Koenig  has a catalogue of films and documentaries he  produced, wrote and directed. The table below chronicles some of the films and documentaries in his filmography.

Personal life
Despite the tragic loss of his partner, Anita Ingrao in 2014 due to stage four breast cancer, Kris pushed through the loss to finish Anita’s last film "SIGHT: The Story of Vision". Kris has four adult children and recently married his wife Marianne.

See also
 400 Years of the Telescope
 Astronomy: Observations and Theories

References

External links
 

1962 births
Living people
American film producers
American film directors
American male screenwriters
American cinematographers
Gilroy High School alumni
Gavilan College alumni